Cinémagazine was a French weekly (later monthly) magazine about cinema from 1921 to 1935.

History and profile
Cinémagazine was established in 1921. It was published weekly from 1921 to 1930, and then monthly from 1930 to 1934. Its editorial board included Marcel Carné, Maurice Bessy, Jean Dréville, Robert Florey, Charles Ford, René Jeanne and Émile Vuillermoz. Contributing photographers included Gaston Paris.

The magazine published many articles against sound film.

References

External links
 Complete Cinémagazine archive with PDFs at Ciné-Ressources.net

1921 establishments in France
1935 disestablishments in France
Defunct magazines published in France
Film magazines published in France
French-language magazines
Monthly magazines published in France
Weekly magazines published in France
Magazines established in 1921
Magazines disestablished in 1935